Calochortus longibarbatus is a species of flowering plant in the lily family with the common names long-haired star-tulip and longbeard mariposa lily. It is native to Oregon, Washington, and northern California, where it grows in the forest and woodlands of the mountains.

It is a bulb-producing perennial herb which produces a branching stem up to about 30 centimeters tall. Flowers are upright, bell-shaped, pink to lavender with darker markings on the petals.

Varieties
 Calochortus longibarbatus var. longibarbatus - most of species range
 Calochortus longibarbatus var. peckii Ownbey - Ochoco Mountains in central Oregon

References

External links
photos by Mark Egger, Flickriver, search for Calochortus longebarbatus several color photos
Pacific Bulb Society, Calochortus Species Three photos of several species
Calphotos Photos Gallery, University of California @ Berkeley

longibarbatus
Flora of the West Coast of the United States
Flora of California
Flora of the Cascade Range
Plants described in 1882
Taxa named by Sereno Watson
Flora without expected TNC conservation status